The Guatemala national handball team is the national team of Guatemala. It takes part in international handball competitions.

Tournament record

Pan American Championship

Central American and Caribbean Games

Central American Games

Central American Championship

IHF South and Central American Emerging Nations Championship

IHF Emerging Nations Championship

References

External links
IHF profile

Handball
Men's national handball teams
Handball in Guatemala